Dnyanmata Vidyalaya, Sangamner, sometimes known as Dnyanmata School, is a private Catholic primary and secondary school located in Sangamner, in the Ahmednagar district, of the state of Maharashtra, India. The school was founded by the  Jesuits in 1948 initially as a primary school and has since expanded to a secondary school through to a junior college.

History 
The school was originally conceived in the line of the gymnasium with classical education in Latin and Greek, in Marathi medium. In 1948 a building was completed and the school opened. The junior college opened in 1976. In 1993 an English-medium school was added, on separate premises up to standard VII.

Dnyanmata is a member of the International Association of Jesuit Business Schools.

The school facilities include a chapel, science laboratories, a multipurpose hall (named in memory of Fr. Thiel), an audio-visual classroom for 10th & 12th standards, a free Spoken English Class, an AV-lab for a multisensory approach to learning, an “Easy Access Library”, and a compound wall to protect the campus from encroachment. Other facilities include boarding facilities and separate facilities for both Marathi and English-medium through VII Standard.

Principals 
The following individuals have served as principal of the school:

See also

 List of Jesuit schools
 List of schools in Maharashtra
 Violence against Christians in India

References 

Jesuit secondary schools in India
Jesuit primary schools in India
Christian schools in Maharashtra
High schools and secondary schools in Maharashtra
Education in Ahmednagar district
Educational institutions established in 1948
1948 establishments in India